Trade unions in Palau. Although the Constitution of Palau recognizes the right to free association, there is no specific mention of trade union rights, including the right of collective bargaining.

Palau is not a member of the International Labour Organization, and there are no functioning trade unions in the country.

ICTUR reports that there is no right to strike, and none have been reported in recent years.

References

Economy of Palau
Organizations based in Palau